Asia New Bay Area is an industrial, exhibition and cultural site located at Kaohsiung, Taiwan. It is a major construction of Kaohsiung City, Taiwan's industrial transformation, in order to promote the urban development of Kaohsiung Harbor and downtown Kaohsiung.

Asia's New Bay Area expands Kaohsiung's international visibility, enabling Kaohsiung to become a Global City to further attract both domestic and foreign investors.

Range 

The total area of the Asia New Bay Area is more than 600 hectares. It is south of Xinwan District in Asia to Kaixuan Road, the north is Wufu Road, the east side is Yixin Road, and the west is to Gushan Hama Star.

 Kaohsiung Exhibition Center
 Kaohsiung Main Public Library
 Kaohsiung Port Terminal
 Kaohsiung Music Center
 Circular light rail
 85 Sky Tower
 China Steel Corporation Headquarters
 Kaohsiung Software Technology Park
 Sanduo Shopping District metro station
 Dream Mall
 Taroko Park

Development and construction 
The Asia New Bay Area is located at the port of Kaohsiung city or in its immediate vicinity. The 500-acre site spans parts of the Gushan, Yancheng, Lingya and Cianjhen districts. The facilities are located on previously industrialized land, which had become vacant and fallow due to the transformation and rationalization of Kaohsiung Harbor. All the buildings in the Asia New Bay Area will adopt international competition and the concept of green buildings, which will promote Kaohsiung City's film industry, exhibition, culture, tourism and Yacht industries.

Hotels
Hotel Nikko Kaohsiung
InterContinental Kaohsiung

Kaohsiung Exhibition Center

Construction on the Kaohsiung Exhibition Center began in October 2011, and on October 18, 2013, the finished building was opened. The first fair held here was the "Taiwan International Fastener Show" on April 14, 2014. In the immediate vicinity of the center, there is the modern high-rise building with the headquarters of China Steel Corporation.

Kaohsiung Music Center

The area of the center extends from Pier 11 to Pier 15 of the port. It consists of an outer concert hall for 12,000 spectators, an inner concert hall for 6,000 spectators and six smaller concert halls for 150 to 400 spectators. It also includes a marine culture exhibition center, a water park, a bike path and a cultural and creative market. The expected completion is planned for August 2020.

Kaohsiung Port Terminal
The Kaohsiung Port Terminal stretches from pier 18 to pier 21 of the Kaohsiung Harbor and includes an administration building, a conference hall and three jetties. The size of the terminal is sufficient to simultaneously accommodate two 225,000-tonne cruise ships. Construction of the terminal is scheduled for November 2016, with the expected opening in June 2020.

Kaohsiung Main Public Library

The 20,000 square meter area houses the Kaohsiung Main Public Library, Taiwan's largest public library. It is an ecological building with eight floors and a basement. The book inventory has over 1 million volumes. The library includes a department for international picture books and a children's theater, the first institution of its kind in the country. Architecture and design work were done by Ricky Liu and the Japanese architect Toyo Ito’s team. Construction started in October 2012 and was completed in 2014. The LIbrary opened to the public in November 2014. In 2017 the library was regarded as one of the top 10 landmarks of Taiwan by TripAdvisor.

Circular light rail

The Circular light rail of Kaohsiung Rapid Transit in Taiwan is a ring-free route with no overhead lines. It is Taiwan's first tram. It has 36 stations and its route runs along the Kaohsiung attractions.

See also 
 Xinyi Special District
 Taichung's 7th Redevelopment Zone
 Taichung Shuinan Economic and Trade Park

References

External links 
Asia New Bay Area Information Network
Kaohsiung City Government
2014 Asia New Bay Area|YouTube
Building an Asian New Bay Area: Integrated Development Plan for Land Use and Track Construction

Planned cities in Taiwan
Proposed infrastructure in Taiwan
Buildings and structures in Kaohsiung
Economy of Taiwan
Urban planning in Taiwan
Central business districts in Taiwan